The Central Mine Planning and Design Institute (acronym CMPDI) is a subsidiary of Coal India Limited which is under the ownership of Ministry of Coal of the Government of India, engaged in the field of environmental engineering and provides consultancy and engineering services across the globe. It is a public sector undertaking under the Government of India and is rated as a Schedule-B and Mini Ratna-II company.

Profile 

The Central Mine Planning and Design Institute Limited was established in 1974, under Coal Mines Authority Limited (CMAL) (former name of Coal India Limited), out of the planning division of now defunct National Coal Development Corporation (NCDC) as a single window set up to consolidate all aspects of Indian mining industry under one roof. Subsequent to the nationalisation of coal mining in India, CMPDI was reconstituted as a public sector undertaking in 1975.

The company has its headquarters in Ranchi, Jharkhand and is involved in mineral exploration, resource evaluation, resource management, mining geology, hydro-geological and geophysical studies and engineering geology investigations. It is an ISO 9001 accredited company and was rated as a Mini Ratna (Category II) company in 2009.

CMPDI is qualified to offer consultancy services in the fields of environmental engineering such as open pit and underground mine planning and design in coal, lignite and other minerals. The Institute is active in geological exploration, geological, geotechnical and allied support, mine planning and design, environmental management and training services.

CMPDI has regional institutes (RIs) at Asansol, Dhanbad, Ranchi, Nagpur, Bilaspur, Singrauli and Bhubaneswar to extend its coverage nationwide and has various field units and exploration camps.

Mandate
CMPDI has two distinct responsibilities, business and corporate, as per the set mandate.

Business functions: Mineral exploration consultancy and support, infrastructure engineering and environmental management.

Corporate functions: Preparation and upkeep of data on coal inventories, operations and potential, advising the Ministry of Coal and NITI Aayog on coal related matters, nodal agency functions on behalf of the Government of India in the matters related to mineral exploration, co-ordination activities between related companies in India and research and development in the field of mineral mining.

Accreditations and collaborations
CMPDI has been accredited with ISO-9001 certification by Certification International (UK). It has also entered into memoranda of understanding with many international agencies such as IMCL, UK, Metchem, Canada, Giproshakht, Russia, Mountain Consulting GmBH, Germany, Rheinbraun Engineering, Germany and DMT, Germany for co-operation in the field of earth resources.

CMPDI acts as registered consultants to:
 World Bank, Washington 
 Asian Development Bank, Manila 
 United Nations Development Programme (UNDP) 
 National Development Corporation, Tanzania 
 Ministry of Mines and Petroleum, Muscat, Sultanate of Oman 
 Ministry of Coal Industry, People's Republic of China 
 African Development Bank, Abidjan

Projects
Apart from various projects for national agencies in the public and private sectors, CMPDI has also undertaken many international projects.
 National Development Corporation, Tanzania: Total consultancy services for exploration, preparation of pre-feasibility and feasibility study for an open pit mining project and associated thermal power project at Mchuchuma, Tanzania. 
 Asian Development Bank, Manila: Feasibility study on Clean Coal Technology jointly accomplished with Mountain – Consulting MbH, Germany.
 United Nations Development Programme (UNDP): Technical and managerial training for North Korea, Oman, Nigeria and Tanzania.
 AMOCO India Petroleum Co, Houston, USA: data generation project on Coal-bed Methane.
 Centre for Coal Utilisation (CCUJ), Japan: consultancy services for Clean Coal Technology.

Awards and recognitions
 Mini Ratna (Category-II) company status in May 2009.
 Highest MoU rating with a Composite MoU Score of 1.0 (maximum) for the year 2009–10.
 Best performing Subsidiary Company of CIL award for the year 2008–09.
 Commendation Certificate of SCOPE Meritorious Award for R&D, Technology Development and Innovation for the year 2009–10.
 Geospatial World Excellence Award 2012, Amsterdam, the Netherlands, for excellent usage of Geospatial technology for land reclamation monitoring of Coal Mines.

Publications
CMPDI publishes a quarterly journal, Minetech – The Indian Mining and Engineering Journal, about mining and related subjects, and the Hindi quarterly magazine "Deshkal Sampada".

The Institute has also published many other titles.

References

External links
 on Wikimapia
 
 ISTM, Government of India circular
 News on IBNLive
 Reference on Inside View
 on YouTube

Companies based in Jharkhand
Technology companies established in 1975
Government-owned companies of India
Coal India subsidiaries
Mining in Jharkhand
Science and technology in India
Mining and the environment
Mining engineering companies
Consulting firms established in 1975
Consulting firms of India
International engineering consulting firms
1975 establishments in Bihar